The European Accessibility Act is a directive of the European Union which took effect in April 2019. This directive aims to improve the trade between members of the EU for accessible products and services, by removing country specific rules. Businesses benefit from having a common set of rules within the EU, which should facilitate easier cross-border trade. It should also allow a greater market for companies providing accessible products and services. Persons with disabilities and elderly people will benefit from having more accessible products and services in the market. An increased market size should produce more competitive prices. There should be fewer barriers within the EU and more job opportunities as well.

Originally proposed in 2011, this act was built to complement the EU's Web Accessibility Directive which became law in 2016. It also reflects the obligations of the UN's Convention on the Rights of Persons with Disabilities. It includes a wide range of systems including personal devices such as computers, smartphones, e-books, and TVs, as well as public services like television broadcast, ATMs, ticketing machines, public transport services, banking services and e-commerce sites.

The laws, regulations and administrative provisions necessary to comply with this Directive have to be adopted and published by the Member States by 28 June 2022. Three years later, in 2025, the requirements of the European Accessibility Act must have been implemented. The requirements and obligations of this Directive do not apply to microenterprises providing services within the scope of this Directive – whereby ‘microenterprise’ means an enterprise which employs fewer than 10 persons and which has an annual turnover not exceeding EUR 2 million or an annual balance sheet total not exceeding EUR 2 million.

The "Design for all” principles on digital technology the creation of the European Harmonized Accessibility Standards EN 301 549 which defines "Accessibility requirements suitable for public procurement of ICT products and services in Europe".

References

External links
 European Accessibility Act: A Big Step On A Long Journey
 Accessibility? Act!
 EU Web Accessibility Compliance and Legislation
 ACCESSIBILITY REQUIREMENTS FOR PRODUCTS AND SERVICES / 2015-12
 European Accessibility Act: final steps on the European level – first steps on the national level
 All set for design for all! An update on the European Accessibility Act
 Video by the European Commission explaining the benefits and background of the EAA

2019 in Europe
2019 in law
Anti-discrimination legislation
Disability legislation
Accessibility
European Union directives
Accessible Procurement